Breakin' Away may refer to:

Breakin' Away (album), a 1981 album by Al Jarreau
"Breakin' Away" (Joe Fagin song), a song performed by Joe Fagin for the TV comedy-drama Auf Wiedersehen, Pet
"Breakin' Away" (song), a 1995 song by Kim Wilde

See also
Breaking Away (disambiguation)